"Sorry" is a song by American singer Halsey, from her second studio album, Hopeless Fountain Kingdom (2017). It was written by Halsey and its producer Greg Kurstin. The track is a ballad where she apologizes to her potential lovers for not letting them to get close to her. The music video for the song was directed by Sing J Lee and Halsey and it was released on February 2, 2018 on Halsey's Vevo channel. The song has achieved over 300 million streams on Spotify, being the third most played song from the album, despite not being an official single.

Composition

"Sorry" was written by Halsey and Greg Kurstin, the latter also producing the song. The song is a simplistic piano arranged ballad which lasts for a duration of 3:40 (three minutes and forty seconds). Written in the key of A♭ major, "Sorry" has a tempo of 74 beats per minute. Halsey's vocal range span from F3 to Bb4. The song's instrumentation comes from piano, guitar and mellotron. Rob Sheffield from Rolling Stone thought that its lyrical content "worries whether she'll ever like herself enough to let anyone get close to her". The song begins with a "somber" piano opening, followed by the lines "I've missed your calls for months it seems/ Don't realize how mean I can be/ Cause I can sometimes treat the people/ That I love like jewelry" sung by Halsey. During the chorus, she sings "So I'm sorry to my unknown lover/ Sorry that I can't believe/ That anybody ever really/ Starts to fall in love with me". Toward the ending, she sings "Someone will love you/ But someone isn't me".

Music video
An accompanying music video for "Sorry" was directed by Sing J Lee and Halsey, who had also helmed the videos for the previous singles, "Now or Never" and "Bad at Love". It was uploaded on February 2, 2018, on Halsey's Vevo channel. The video begins with the singer with wounds on her face after a car crash from the ending of "Now or Never", she starts walking on a street on fire with dead bodies and abandoned vehicles everywhere. The video was filmed as a one-shot.

Credits and personnel
Credits adapted from Tidal.

Ashley Frangipane – songwriter, vocals
Greg Kurstin − songwriter, producer, guitar, mellotron, piano, recording engineer
John Hanes − mixing engineer
Serban Ghenea − mixer
Alex Pasco − recording engineer
Julian Burg − recording engineer

Certifications

References

External links
 

2010s ballads
2017 songs
Astralwerks singles
Halsey (singer) songs
Songs written by Halsey (singer)
Songs written by Greg Kurstin
Song recordings produced by Greg Kurstin